Chief Douglas Parker is a supporting character in stories published by DC Comics featuring Superboy, the younger version of Superman.

Publication history
Chief Douglas Parker first appeared in Adventure Comics #225 (June 1956) and was created by Alvin Schwartz and Curt Swan.

Fictional character biography

Pre-Crisis
Douglas Parker first encountered the future Superboy as a rookie officer on the Smallville Police Department (although Parker remained unaware of this fact). Parker apprehended the Pumpkin Gang while being secretly assisted by Clark Kent, who was still a toddler at the time. The capture earned the officer a promotion to police captain. He would steadily advance in the ranks, eventually becoming Smalllville's chief of police.

Chief Parker was a staunch ally of the Boy of Steel. In fact, Superboy entrusted him with a signal device linked to a lamp in the Kent home. The lamp would flicker whenever Superboy was being summoned. Lana Lang's father Professor Lewis Lang and the President of the United States were given similar devices.

As the chief law enforcement official in Superboy's hometown, Parker often encountered the Boy of Steel's allies and enemies. He helped restore Superboy's reputation after a rash of incidents engineered by the Kryptonian teenager Dev-Em. Chief Parker and his wife Leah briefly welcomed teenager "Marie Elkins" into their home, unaware that she was actually Duo Damsel, a member of the futuristic Legion of Super-Heroes who was hiding from the sorcerer Mordru. Most notably, Parker was frequently forced to contend with Superboy's most persistent enemy, the teenage scientific genius Lex Luthor.

After the deaths of Jonathan and Martha Kent, an eighteen-year-old Superboy left Smallville for Metropolis and eventually changed his name to Superman. Parker retired from law enforcement, occasionally visiting the vacant Kent home to ensure that it did not fall into disrepair.

Post-Crisis
Following the Crisis on Infinite Earths limited series, Superman's history was revised, such that Clark Kent did not begin his public superhero career until adulthood, and thus never operated as Superboy. While most of the Boy of Steel's supporting characters (Lana Lang, Pete Ross, the Kents) were reinterpreted for the revised continuity, Chief Parker was not. He has made almost no comic book appearances since the conclusion of Crisis on Infinite Earths in 1986. However, it has been established that — in post-Infinite Crisis continuity — Parker was indeed the Smallville Police Chief during Clark's childhood. He was the one who told a younger Lex Luthor that his father had died.

In other media
 Chief Parker makes his only live-action appearance in the  pilot episode of The Adventures of Superboy TV series that was produced in 1961, portrayed by Robert Williams. The pilot was never picked up for broadcast, but is available today on various websites, and was included in the DVD box set Smallville: The Complete Series (which was released in November 2011).
 On the long-running Smallville television series, the Kansas town is identified as part of the fictitious Lowell County and law enforcement is overseen by the county sheriff instead of Chief Parker. The position of county sheriff was first held by Ethan Miller (portrayed by Mitchell Kosterman). After Miller was arrested for the attempted murder of Lionel Luthor and the framing of Jonathan Kent, he was succeeded by Nancy Adams (portrayed by Camille Mitchell) who appears in 22 episodes until the episode "Lockdown" when she is killed by Deputy Harris at the time when she and her fiancé Greg Flynn was search for the black ship.

References

External links
 Douglas Parker (Earth-One) at DC Comics Wiki
 Douglas Parker (New Earth) at DC Comics Wiki

DC Comics characters
Comics characters introduced in 1956
DC Comics police officers
Fictional characters from Kansas